Lund Food Holdings, Inc is an American supermarket operator. Headquartered in Edina, it owns the upscale supermarket chain Lunds & Byerlys.  The company opened its first supermarkets in the Uptown area of Minneapolis.  In 2015, it changed its name from Lunds to Lunds & Byerlys. It operates 28 stores in Minneapolis-St. Paul metro area of Minnesota.

History

Lunds History

Russell T. Lund Sr. founded a grocery called Hove's in 1939 at the corner of Lake Street and Hennepin Avenue in the Uptown neighborhood of Minneapolis. Russell Lund Sr., an employee, took an equity stake in the cheese and cracker department in 1922 and after founding a popcorn business, a larger stake in 1939. The chain took the Lunds name in 1964.

Lunds and Byerly's were competing companies until 1997 when Lunds acquired Byerly's.  They continued to operate under their individual names until April 2015, when the stores were rebranded Lunds & Byerlys. In 2006, they launched its online grocery shopping service. Shoppers have the option of either picking up their groceries at certain stores or having it delivered to their home.

Byerly's History

Byerly's was founded in 1968 by Don Byerly, who opened the first store in Golden Valley, Minnesota. Byerly's opened fourteen other stores in the metro area.

Byerly's locations offered in-store United States Post Offices, full-service banks, coffee shops, floral departments, wines & spirits shops, and in-store Byerly's restaurants. All Byerly's branded restaurants have now closed, but a restaurant named "Minnesota Grill" still operates out of the Roseville store location offering limited Lund's and Byerly's food items.

The store was known for its "great customer service" and its deli and bakery. Byerly's was commonly viewed as high-end grocery shopping, and prices were relatively similar to other retail stores selling the same brands.  Product quality was the core focus of Byerlys and the prices reflect higher quality products.

In April 1997, the company was purchased by Lund Food Holdings, Inc., parent company of Edina-based Lunds.

Store Openings

History of Lunds store openings

 1939 Minneapolis (Hennepin & Lake)
 1942 Edina (50th & France)
 1967 Richfield (Penn Avenue)
 1969 Minnetonka
 1983 St. Paul (Ford Parkway)
 1984 Wayzata
 1994 Bloomington (Normandale)
 2001 Plymouth
 2006 Orono (Navarre)
 2006 Minneapolis (Central & University, in Cobalt Condominiums)
 2012 Minneapolis (12th & Hennepin)
 2013 Prior Lake
 2014 Wayzata (Town Center) (Lunds & Byerlys Kitchen) Closed 2017
 2014 St. Paul (downtown in the Penfield)
 2018 White Bear Lake (Bordering White Bear Township)

History of Byerly's store openings
 1968 Golden Valley
 1971 St. Paul (East Side) (closed)
 1973 Edina (France Ave/Southdale) (Rebuilt as new structure in 2014)
 1977 St. Cloud
 1980 St. Louis Park
 1982 Minnetonka
 1986 Bloomington (Lyndale) (closed)
 1987 Roseville 
 1988 Burnsville 
 1994 Chanhassen 
 1996 Eagan
 1996 Highland Park (closed)
 1999 Maple Grove
 2006 Minneapolis
 2014 Woodbury
 2014 Eden Prairie

History of Lunds & Byerlys store openings
 2015 Minnetonka (Glen Lake)
 2018 White Bear Lake
 2021 Minneapolis (Nokomis, on Cedar Avenue near Minnehaha Parkway, in Noko Apartments)

References

External links
 Lunds & Byerlys website

Companies based in Edina, Minnesota
Supermarkets of the United States
Retail companies established in 1939
Privately held companies based in Minnesota
1939 establishments in Minnesota